Limuna Mohammed Muniru is a Ghanaian politician and the Northern Regional Minister of Ghana. Prior to heading the Northern region, he was Upper East Regional Minister and a Minister of State at the Presidency.

Early life and education 
Limuna Mohammed Muniru was born on 8 August 1967. He started his primary school at United Primary School in Tamale. He attended London School of Hygiene and Tropical Medicine in 2007 -2008. Ghana Institute of Management and Public Administration (GIMPA)  in April 2005.

Personal life 
He is Married with four children.

References

Living people
National Democratic Congress (Ghana) politicians
Year of birth missing (living people)